The Foreign Branches of Fondo de Cultura Económica (FCE) are offices this Mexican publishing house has established outside of Mexico. The first foreign branch of FCE opened in Argentina 1945. These branches, which include bookstores, aim to promote the books written in Spanish throughout the region and the world.

FCE Argentina 

The first foreign branch of Fondo de Cultura Económica was inaugurated in 1945 in Argentina, by Fondo de Cultura Económica director Arnaldo Orfila Reynal, who served as the first manager. FCE Argentina promotes Mexican culture and its topmost scientific and literary writers. During the 1990s, FCE Argentina started its own editorial program that alternates the publishing of Argentine and foreign writers through translations.

FCE Brazil 

Established June 21, 1991, the Azteca bookstore of Fondo de Cultura Económica in Brazil includes efforts to promote linguistic exchange among Portuguese and Spanish-speaking communities in Brazil.

FCE Chile 

The Fondo de Cultura Económica operation in Chile was first established in 1954, though it was limited until diplomatic relations between Mexico and this country were reestablished in 1973.
 
This branch has consolidated its own editorial program through the joint publishing of books with the Inter-American Development Bank and the Economical Commission for Latin America.

FCE Colombia 

Fondo de Cultura Económica established a distributing agency in Colombia in 1975 that aimed to import and distribute books that were originally printed in Mexico. However, this role was expanded in 1984, when FCE Colombia was formally constituted as a publishing house in Bogotá. Since then, this branch’s role has been to reprint and market titles for the Colombian readers in order to reduce their selling costs.

In 2000 FCE Colombia acquired its own building.

FCE Guatemala and Central America 

FCE’s branch in Guatemala has a program for promoting and commercializing books throughout the Central American region. Additionally, an editorial program was started in 2000 that specializes in printing Mayan-Spanish bilingual books by famous Guatemalan authors.

FCE Peru 

In 1975 the branch of Fondo de Cultura Económica in Lima, Peru, opened.

FCE Spain 

The branch of Fondo de Cultura Económica in Spain was established on April 24, 1963. FCE Spain has signed multiple agreements with local universities. It has co-published, among many other works, collections of works by Miguel de Cervantes (in collaboration with the Universidad de Alcalá de Henares), and Génesis y desarrollo del Estado moderno (in collaboration with the European Science Foundation).

FCE USA 

FCE USA is the foreign branch of Mexican publishing house Fondo de Cultura Económica in the United States, established on September 7, 1990.

In order to augment its presence in the USA, FCE USA signed an agreement with Lectorum-Scholastic for the distribution and commercialization of books among the latter’s library and school networks

FCE Venezuela 

The building in which the branch of Fondo de Cultura Económica in Venezuela is established was inaugurated in 1994, and it comprises a bookstore, the administrative offices and a distribution company. FCE Venezuela has opened two bookstores in Caracas.

Book publishing companies of Mexico